is a Japanese zombie horror manga series created by Koji Aihara. It's serialized in Bessatsu Manga Goraku magazine by Nihon Bungeisha. The first volume was published in April 2013. It was adapted into a live action film in 2014 directed by Norio Tsuruta.

Film cast
 Mayu Kawamoto
 Noriko Kijima
 Miharu Tanaka

References

External links
Official film website 

2013 manga
Horror anime and manga
Manga adapted into films
Nihon Bungeisha manga
Seinen manga
Zombies in comics
Zombies in anime and manga
Japanese horror films